Bryan Byrne may refer to:
 Bryan Byrne (footballer)
 Bryan Byrne (rugby union)

See also
 Brian Byrne (disambiguation)